Sam Sweeney is a musician.

Sam Sweeney may also refer to:

Sam Sweeney (cricketer)
Sam Sweeney, character in New Girl (TV series)